is a Japanese documentary film directed by Masao Adachi about serial killer Norio Nagayama. Completed in 1969, it was first shown publicly in 1975. Adachi collaborated on the film with critic Matsuda Masao, director Nagisa Ōshima, and screenwriter Mamoru Sasaki.

See also 
 Live Today, Die Tomorrow!, a 1970 drama film on Nagayama

References

External links
 
 

1975 films
1975 documentary films
Japanese documentary films
1970s Japanese films